The Ladin Autonomist Union (UAL) is a minor progressive-centrist political party in Trentino, Italy, that seeks to represent the Ladin minority in the Province and especially that living in Fassa Valley. Its main leader is Giuseppe Detomas.

The party was formed in 1983 and its founder Ezio Anesi was elected that year provincial deputy for the Italian Republican Party. In the 1992 Anesi was elected to the Italian Senate for the Italian Socialist Party.

After the disappearance of the so-called First Republic parties, including the Socialists, the UAL formed an alliance with the Trentino Tyrolean Autonomist Party (PATT) at the provincial level and with The Olive Tree (l'Ulivo) at the national level. Under these agreements, Anesi was elected to the Provincial Council in 1993 from the PATT slate, while Detomas represented UAL in the Chamber of Deputies from 1996 to 2006. That was the highest point for the party.

Since the introduction in 2003 of a seat for the Ladin minority, the UAL has always prevailed. In the 2013 provincial election it won 1.1% of the vote (51.8% in Fassa Falley). However, in 2015, the party was defeated by the Fassa Association in the Fassa community elections, the first after the introduction of valley communities in 2006.

In the 2016 Italian constitutional referendum won Fassa supported the No  with 57.9% against the UAL supported Yes in Fassa Valley.

Electoral results
Results are expressed in %. Before 2003, the UAL usually did not contest the elections as a stand-alone list.

References

External links
Official website

Political parties in Trentino
Ladinia
Political parties established in 1983
1983 establishments in Italy
Political parties of minorities